John Alfred Vinter (1828–1905) was a British painter.

Life 
John Alfred Vinter was born .

He worked as a painter and lithographer of portraits and genre scenes.

He died on 28 May 1905.

Works 

 London (National Portrait Gallery): Sir Rowland Hill, oil on canvas, from an anonymous photograph.

Notes

References 

 Beyer, Andreas; Savoy, Bénédicte; Tegethoff, Wolf, eds. (2021) "Vinter, John Alfred". In Allgemeines Künstlerlexikon Online. De Gruyter. Retrieved 12 May 2022.
 Oliver, Valerie Cassel, ed. (2011) "Vinter, John Alfred". In Benezit Dictionary of Artists. Oxford Art Online. Oxford University Press. Retrieved 12 May 2022.
 "John Alfred Vinter (1828?-1905), Portrait painter and printmaker". National Portrait Gallery. Retrieved 12 May 2022.
 "John Alfred Vinter". The British Museum. Retrieved 12 May 2022.
 "Royal Academy". The Morning Chronicle. 12 December 1845. p. 5. Newspapers.com. Retrieved 12 May 2022.

1828 births
1905 deaths
19th-century British painters